The  Monte Antoroto is a mountain of the Ligurian Alps located in Piedmont (NW Italy).

Geography  

The mountain is located on the watershed between the upper Valley of Tanaro and the Casotto valley. The Colla Bassa saddle (1,851 m) divides it from Monte Grosso (East), while westwards the ridge goes on with Cima Ciuaiera (2,175 m) and Colla dei Termini. Close to the summit of the Monte Antoroto stands a rounded and grassy subsummit, some metres lower than the main summit.

The mountain is mainly made of sedimentary limestone, as usual in the Ligurian Alps. Monte Antoroto is clearly visible from Valdinferno (comune of Garessio) and from Ormea, which stands at the feet of its overhanging southern cliffs.

SOIUSA classification 
According to the SOIUSA (International Standardized Mountain Subdivision of the Alps) the mountain can be classified in the following way:
 main part = Western Alps
 major sector = South Western Alps
 section = Ligurian Alps
 subsection = It:Alpi del Marguareis/Fr:Alpes Liguriennes Occidentales
 supergroup = It:Catena Marguareis-Mongioie/Fr:Chaîne Marguareis-Mongioie
 group = It:Gruppo Pizzo d'Ormea-Monte Antoroto
 subgroup = It:Costiera Bric di Conolia-Pizzo d'Ormea
 code = I/A-1.II-B.5.a

Nature conservation 
The Monte Antoroto belongs to a S.C.I. also named Monte Antoroto  (cod. IT1160035), whose specific conservation rules were approved by the Regione Piemonte in 2016.

Access to the summit 

The Monte Antoroto can be reached from Valcasotto following a waymarked foothpath  with a vertical climb of about 1,200 m. A slightly shorter hiking itinerary starts from Valdinferno, a village belonging to the Garessio comune.
The summit offers a very broad view on Western Alps and Ligurian Apennine. In good weather conditions also on the Ligurian sea and Golfo di Genova  can be seen behind the Ligurian Prealps (Armetta-Galero ridge).

Mountain huts 
 Rifugio Angelo Manolino
 Rifugio Savona, near Valdinferno.

Maps

References

Mountains of the Ligurian Alps
Mountains of Piedmont
Two-thousanders of Italy